The Peruvian football league system is a complex system. Though the general outline includes the Liga 1, Liga 2 and Copa Perú. The Copa Perú is very large involving several stages and leagues within it. In addition, the Copa Perú is played within a year. Therefore, clubs who reach level 3 of the pyramid (National stage of the Copa Perú) will have climbed 4 levels in a one-year period.

Current league system (2023)

Historic tables 
The following charts detail all league competitions organised by the Peruvian Football Federation:

Year by year

La Liga Peruana de fútbol (Lima & Callao)
Defunct tournaments indicated in

National era

See also
Peruvian Primera División
Peruvian Segunda División
Copa Perú
Ligas Superiores del Peru
List of football clubs in Peru

Peru